Bruno Colaço (born 11 October 1991) is an Indian professional footballer who plays as a goalkeeper for Goa.

Career

Sporting Goa
Colaço began his career with SESA Football Academy until 2012 when he played for Margao Sports Club in the Goa Professional League. He then signed for Sporting Clube de Goa of the I-League and made his debut for the club on 20 January 2013 against Pune F.C. at the Balewadi Sports Complex in which he helped Sporting Goa maintain a clean-sheet as the club drew the match 0–0.

Bengaluru FC
After spending half a season with Sporting Clube de Goa, Colaço signed with new direct-entry club Bengaluru FC for the 2013–14 season. He made his debut with the club in the I-League on 2 November 2013 against Mumbai F.C. at the Balewadi Sports Complex in which he played the full match as Bengaluru FC drew the match 2–2.

Career statistics

References

1991 births
Living people
Sporting Clube de Goa players
Bengaluru FC players
Association football goalkeepers
Footballers from Goa
I-League players
Indian footballers